Williams Bluff is a rock and ice bluff 7 nautical miles (13 km) east of Keim Peak in the Usarp Mountains. The east-facing bluff rises between the Pitzman and Lovejoy Glaciers. Mapped by United States Geological Survey (USGS) from surveys and U.S. Navy air photos, 1960–62. Named by Advisory Committee on Antarctic Names (US-ACAN) for Harry N. Williams of U.S. Navy Squadron VX-6, aerial photographer on flights over Victoria Land and other Antarctic areas in three summer seasons, 1960–63.

Cliffs of Victoria Land
Pennell Coast
Geography of the Ross Dependency